Gohlke is a surname. Notable people with the surname include:

 Frank Gohlke (born 1942), American landscape photographer
 Gerrit Gohlke (born 1999), German football player
 Nicole Gohlke (born 1975), German politician